The Kitcisakik Anicinape Community, which the official name is communauté anicinape de Kitcisakik, is an Indian band of the Algonquin First Nations in Quebec, Canada. In 2017 the band had a registered population of 498 members.

Demographics
The members of the Kitcisakik Anicinape Community are Algonquin people. In March 2017 the band had a total registered population of 498 members, 88 of which lived off reserve. According to Statistics Canada's 2011 Census the median age of the population is 17.5 years old.

Geography
The closest main cities are Rouyn-Noranda and Val-d'Or. In fact the community is located 90 km southeast of Val-d'or.

Government
The Kitcisakik Anicinape Community is governed by a band council, the Conseil des Anicinapek de Kitcisakik, elected according to a custom electoral system based on the Section 11 of the Indian Act. For 2013-2017 tenure this council is composed of the chief Adrienne Anichinapéo and three councillors.

See also
Kitcisakik
Algonquin people
First Nations
Aboriginal peoples in Quebec
La Vérendrye Wildlife Reserve

References

External links
 
First Nation Detail by Indigenous and Northern Affairs Canada

Populated places in Abitibi-Témiscamingue
First Nations governments in Quebec